Automated journalism, also known as algorithmic journalism or robot journalism, is a term that attempts to describe modern technological processes that have infilitrated the journalistic profession, such as news articles generated by computer programs. There are four main fields of application for automated journalism, namely automated content production, Data Mining, news dissemination and content optimization. Through artificial intelligence (AI) software, stories are produced automatically by computers rather than human reporters. These programs interpret, organize, and present data in human-readable ways. Typically, the process involves an algorithm that scans large amounts of provided data, selects from an assortment of pre-programmed article structures, orders key points, and inserts details such as names, places, amounts, rankings, statistics, and other figures. The output can also be customized to fit a certain voice, tone, or style.

Data science and AI companies such as Automated Insights, Narrative Science, United Robots and Monok develop and provide these algorithms to news outlets. As of 2016, only a few media organizations have used automated journalism. Early adopters include news providers such as the Associated Press, Forbes, ProPublica, and the Los Angeles Times.

Early implementations were mainly used for stories based on statistics and numerical figures. Common topics include sports recaps, weather, financial reports, real estate analysis, and earnings reviews. StatSheet, an online platform covering college basketball, runs entirely on an automated program. The Associated Press began using automation to cover 10,000 minor baseball leagues games annually, using a program from Automated Insights and statistics from MLB Advanced Media. Outside of sports, the Associated Press also uses automation to produce stories on corporate earnings. In 2006, Thomson Reuters announced their switch to automation to generate financial news stories on its online news platform. More famously, an algorithm called Quakebot published a story about a 2014 California earthquake on The Los Angeles Times website within three minutes after the shaking had stopped.

Automated journalism is sometimes seen as an opportunity to free journalists from routine reporting, providing them with more time for complex tasks. It also allows efficiency and cost-cutting, alleviating some financial burden that many news organizations face. However, automated journalism is also perceived as a threat to the authorship and quality of news and a threat to the livelihoods of human journalists.

Benefits

Speed 
Robot reporters are built to produce large quantities of information at quicker speeds. The Associated Press announced that their use of automation has increased the volume of earnings reports from customers by more than ten times. With software from Automated Insights and data from other companies, they can produce 150 to 300-word articles in the same time it takes journalists to crunch numbers and prepare information. By automating routine stories and tasks, journalists are promised more time for complex jobs such as investigative reporting and in-depth analysis of events.

Francesco Marconi of the Associated Press stated that, through automation, the news agency freed up 20 percent of reporters’ time to focus on higher-impact projects.

Cost 
Automated journalism is cheaper because more content can be produced within less time. It also lowers labour costs for news organizations. Reduced human input means less expenses on wages or salaries, paid leaves, vacations, and employment insurance. Automation serves as a cost-cutting tool for news outlets struggling with tight budgets but still wish to maintain the scope and quality of their coverage.

Criticisms

Authorship 
In an automated story, there is often confusion about who should be credited as the author. Several participants of a study on algorithmic authorship attributed the credit to the programmer; others perceived the news organization as the author, emphasizing the collaborative nature of the work. There is also no way for the reader to verify whether an article was written by a robot or human, which raises issues of transparency although such issues also arise with respect to authorship attribution between human authors too.

Credibility and quality 
Concerns about the perceived credibility of automated news is similar to concerns about the perceived credibility of news in general. Critics doubt if algorithms are "fair and accurate, free from subjectivity, error, or attempted influence." Again, these issues about fairness, accuracy, subjectivity, error, and attempts at influence or propaganda has also been present in articles written by humans over thousands of years. A common criticism is that machines do not replace human capabilities such as creativity, humour, and critical-thinking. However, as the technology evolves, the aim is to mimic human characteristics. When the UK's Guardian newspaper used an AI to write an entire article in September 2020, commentators pointed out that the AI still relied on human editorial content. Austin Tanney, the head of AI at Kainos said: "The Guardian got three or four different articles and spliced them together. They also gave it the opening paragraph. It doesn’t belittle what it is. It was written by AI, but there was human editorial on that."

Beyond human evaluation, there are now numerous algorithmic methods to identify machine written articles although some articles may still contain errors that are obvious for a human to identify, they can at times score better with these automatic identifiers than human-written articles.

Employment 
Among the concerns about automation is the loss of employment for journalists as publishers switch to using AIs. In 2014, an annual census from The American Society of News Editors announced that the newspaper industry lost 3,800 full-time, professional editors. Falling by more than 10% within a year, this is the biggest drop since the industry cut over 10,000 jobs in 2007 and 2008.

Dependence on platform and technology companies 
There has been a significant amount of recent scholarship on the relationship between platform companies, such as Google and Facebook, and the news industry with researchers examining the impact of these platforms on the distribution and monetization of news content, as well as the implications for journalism and democracy. Some scholars have extended this line of thinking to automated journalism and the use of AI in the news. A 2022 paper by the Oxford University academic Felix Simon, for example, argues that the concentration of AI tools and infrastructure in the hands of a few major technology companies, such as Google, Microsoft, and Amazon Web Services, is a significant issue for the news industry, as it risks shifting more control to these companies and increasing the industry's dependence on them. Simon argues that this could lead to vendor lock-in, where news organizations become structurally dependent on AI provided by these companies and are unable to switch to another vendor without incurring significant costs. The companies also possess artefactual and contractual control over their AI infrastructure and services, which could expose news organizations to the risk of unforeseen changes or the stopping of their AI solutions entirely. Additionally, the author argues the reliance on these companies for AI can make it more difficult for news organizations to understand the decisions or predictions made by the systems and can limit their ability to protect sources or proprietary business information.

Opinions on automated journalism
A 2017 Nieman Reports article by Nicola Bruno discusses whether or not machines will replace journalists and addresses concerns around the concept of automated journalism practices. Ultimately, Bruno came to the conclusion that AI would assist journalists, not replace them. "No automated software or amateur reporter will ever replace a good journalist", she said.

In 2020, however, Microsoft did just that - replacing 27 journalists with AI. One staff member was quoted by The Guardian as saying: “I spend all my time reading about how automation and AI is going to take all our jobs, and here I am – AI has taken my job.” The journalist went on to say that replacing humans with software was risky, as existing staff were careful to stick to “very strict editorial guidelines” which ensured that users were not presented with violent or inappropriate content when opening their browser, for example.

List of implementations 

 In May 2020, Microsoft announced that a number of its MSN contract journalists would be replaced by robot journalism.
 On 8 September 2020, The Guardian published an article entirely written by the neural network GPT-3, although the published fragments were manually picked by a human editor.

References   

Journalism
Applications of artificial intelligence
Natural language generation
Types of journalism